Sergio Pérez Leyva (born 15 May 1993) is a Spanish footballer who plays for UB Conquense as a goalkeeper.

Football career
Born in Vitoria-Gasteiz, Álava, Basque Country, Pérez was a graduate of Deportivo Alavés' youth setup, and made his senior debut with the reserves in the 2012–13 campaign, in the Tercera División. On 28 November 2012, he was named on the substitutes' bench with the main squad for the match against FC Barcelona, but remained unused in the Copa del Rey 1–3 away loss.

In June 2013, Pérez moved to another reserve team, CD Mirandés B in the regional leagues. On 28 September 2014, he appeared in his first game with the main squad, starting in a 0–2 away loss against Real Betis in the Segunda División.

Pérez was promoted to the first team ahead of the 2015–16 season, but remained as a backup for Raúl Fernández. After the latter's departure to Levante UD, he was made a starter ahead of the new signing Roberto Gutiérrez, but the campaign ended in relegation.

References

External links

1993 births
Living people
Footballers from Vitoria-Gasteiz
Spanish footballers
Association football goalkeepers
Segunda División players
Segunda División B players
Tercera División players
Deportivo Alavés B players
CD Mirandés B players
CD Mirandés footballers
UE Cornellà players
CD Toledo players
UB Conquense footballers
Burgos CF Promesas players